Princess Dorothea of Schleswig-Holstein-Sonderburg-Glücksburg (28 September 1636 – 6 August 1689), was Duchess consort of Brunswick-Lüneburg by marriage to Christian Louis, Duke of Brunswick-Lüneburg, and Electress of Brandenburg by marriage to Frederick William, Elector of Brandenburg, the "Great Elector".

Biography 
Dorothea was born in Glücksburg.  She could claim royal blood through her descent from her great-grandfather King Christian III of Denmark, but her parents were of much lower rank: Philip, Duke of Schleswig-Holstein-Sonderburg-Glücksburg, and Sophia Hedwig of Saxe-Lauenburg. She was the sister of Auguste of Schleswig-Holstein-Sonderburg-Glücksburg.

Duchess of Brunswick-Lüneburg
In 1653, Dorothea married Christian Louis, Duke of Brunswick-Lüneburg, brother-in-law of King Frederick III of Denmark. The marriage was childless.  In 1665 her first spouse died, and she moved into Herzberg Castle.

Electress of Brandenburg
On 14 June 1668, she married again, this time to Frederick William, Elector of Brandenburg.  In 1670, she purchased Brandenburg-Schwedt and other fiefs for her sons. In 1676, she became the commander of her own regiment, and in 1678 and 1692 equipped two fleets for the Brandenburg state.

She died in Karlsbad and is buried in Berlin Cathedral. The Dorotheenstadt neighbourhood of Berlin was a present to her from her husband and is named after her.

Issue
From her second marriage, Dorothea had the following children:
 Philip William (1669–1711),
 Marie Amalie (1670–1739) married:
 Charles of Mecklenburg-Güstrow, son of Gustav Adolph, Duke of Mecklenburg-Güstrow
 Maurice William, Duke of Saxe-Zeitz, son of Maurice, Duke of Saxe-Zeitz
 Albert Frederick (1672–1731),
 Charles Philip (1673–1695),
 Elisabeth Sofie (1674–1748), who married Christian Ernst of Brandenburg-Bayreuth (6 August 1644 – 20 May 1712) on 30 March 1703.
 Dorothea (1675–1676),
 Christian Ludwig (1677–1734), recipient of Bach's Brandenburg Concertos.

Ancestry

References

|-

|-

|-

|-

1636 births
1689 deaths
Consorts of Brandenburg
Prussian royal consorts
Electresses of Brandenburg
Duchesses of Brunswick-Lüneburg
Duchesses of Prussia
House of Hohenzollern
House of Glücksburg
New House of Lüneburg
Burials at Berlin Cathedral
Remarried royal consorts